WOMADelaide is an annual four-day festival of Music, Arts and Dance, which was first held in 1992 in Botanic Park, Adelaide, South Australia. One of many WOMAD festivals held around the world, it is a four-day event that presents a diverse selection of music from artists around the world, as well as side events like talks and discussions.

History

WOMADelaide was first run in 1992 as part of the Adelaide Festival of Arts. From 1993 it ran every two years (in odd-numbered years) so as to not conflict with subsequent editions of the Festival. From 1996 the management and production of WOMADelaide was taken on by the Adelaide-based company, Arts Projects Australia.

In 2003, WOMADelaide became an annual festival, following a decision made by the Rann government to financially support the event. That year, WOMADelaide Foundation Limited was also established as a not-for-profit organisation. The Foundation presented subsequent festivals and special projects for remote Indigenous arts communities.

In 2010, in celebration of the 50th Anniversary of the Adelaide Festival of Arts, WOMADelaide extended to four days. Due to overwhelming popularity, the festival has continued at this length. That year, WOMADelaide was produced and presented by the WOMADelaide Foundation, was managed by Arts Projects Australia and WOMAD Ltd, and was presented in association with the Government of South Australia.

In 2015 the South Australian Tourism Commission (an agency of the Government of South Australia) replaced the Government of South Australia as the event's new principal partner. As of 2017, the South Australian Tourism Commission remains the event's principal partner.

In 2017, WOMADelaide became a smoke-free event, with provision for smoking in three designated areas.

In 2021, due to the COVID-19 pandemic in Australia, WOMADelaide was held in King Rodney Park / Ityamai-itpina instead of its usual location at Botanic Park, so that the venue could comply with the restrictions necessary to prevent any possible spread of COVID-19. The format was changed to a series of seated concerts on a single stage, opening with Archie Roach and closing with Midnight Oil and First Nations collaborators on their Makarrata Live project. This was also the first year of WOMADelaide x NSS Academy, a collaboration with the youth music centre Northern Sound System, which was established to provide training and development program for emerging Aboriginal South Australians and multicultural artists. The program identified 10 artists in its first year or operation, with musical duo MRLN x RKM selected to support Vika & Linda and Midnight Oil at WOMAD.

Description
The event is hosted by the WOMAD festivals organisation, which aims "to excite, to create, to inform and to highlight awareness of the worth and potential of a multicultural society". The festival encourages people to experience the music of cultures other than their own as a way of developing global understanding, and aims to entertain all age groups and people from all backgrounds. WOMADelaide has won the Helpmann Award for "Best Contemporary Music Festival" in 2008 and 2016, the Australian Event Awards "Best Cultural, Arts or Music Event" in 2015, and the Fowlers Live / SA Music Awards "Best Live Music Event" for five years in a row, 2012 - 2016.

Festival site and layout

WOMADelaide is usually held in Botanic Park, which is situated north-east of central Adelaide, between the Adelaide Zoo and Adelaide Botanic Garden. The  park is fenced off for the duration of the festival. The main stages are set up around a backstage compound with Stage 1 in the middle and Stages 2 and 3 on either side, all facing out from the backstage area. There are an additional four smaller stages (Zoo Stage, Moreton Bay Stage and two in Speakers Corner). There are also visual arts exhibitions, a KidZone, a Global Village market area with over 100 food, crafts and display stalls, as well as several bars. All front-of-stage areas, the KidZone and the food and drink area are designated smoke-free.

WOMADelaide has worked closely with Zero Waste SA in waste minimisation. After the 2005 festival, some six tonnes of compost from WOMADelaide waste were returned to the Adelaide Botanic Garden, in an effort to preserve the delicate ecosystem in which the event is located. In 2007, WOMADelaide joined forces with Greening Australia, Australia’s largest environmental organisation, to remove the global warming impact of the event. The carbon generated through artists’ travel, and the festival site lighting and power was offset through the re-vegetation of native bushland in SA, which also helped to restore native habitat for rare and endangered species, and to reduce the effects of salinity.

Reception 
WOMADelaide has grown steadily in audience size from 30,000 in 1993 to over 90,000 annually since 2014. "About 95,000" people attended in 2015. All prior attendance records were broken in 2016 when over 95,000 people attended.

In 2008 WOMADelaide won the FasterLouder Festival Award for best Sound & Production. WOMADelaide also received the 2008 Helpmann Award for Best Contemporary Music Festival.

National Live Music Awards
The National Live Music Awards (NLMAs) are a broad recognition of Australia's diverse live industry, celebrating the success of the Australian live scene. The awards commenced in 2016.

|-
| National Live Music Awards of 2016
| WOMADelaide
| South Australian Live Event of the Year
| 
|-
| National Live Music Awards of 2020
| WOMADelaide
| Best Live Music Festival or Event
| 
|-

South Australian Music Awards
The South Australian Music Awards (previously known as the Fowler's Live Music Awards) are annual awards that exist to recognise, promote and celebrate excellence in the South Australian contemporary music industry. They commenced in 2012. WOMADelaide won five awards.

 
|-
| 2012
| WOMADelaide
| Most Popular SA Live Music Event 
| 
|- 
| 2013
| WOMADelaide
| Favourite SA Live Music Event  
| 
|- 
| 2014
| WOMADelaide
| Favourite SA Live Music Event  
| 
|- 
| 2015
| WOMADelaide
| Best Festival / Music Event  
| 
|- 
| 2016
| WOMADelaide
| Best Festival / Music Event 
| 
|-

Programming

WOMADelaide draws its performing artists from all over the world.  A specific emphasis is placed on traditional music and performances of various cultures although some more contemporary, popular acts are included. The festival runs from 6pm to 1am on Friday, from 12noon until 1am on Saturday and from 12noon-12midnight on Sunday. In 2010, due to substantial popularity WOMADelaide was extended to include Monday from 12noon - 12midnight, making the festival four days in length. Artists also lead workshops demonstrating and/or discussing aspects of their performances on smaller stages. There are also artists who do "roving" performances through the park and installation pieces, such as La Compagnie Carabosse, who set up large fire installations at the 2005 festival.

Some of the many artists who have appeared at WOMADelaide include:

A.B. Original
Afro Celt Sound System
Azadoota
The Beautiful Girls
Black Grace
Blue King Brown
Briggs
Sarah Blasko
John Butler Trio
Capercaillie
Kev Carmody
The Cat Empire
Jimmy Cliff
The Correspondents
Crowded House
Daara J
The Dhol Foundation
Dirty Three
Fat Freddy's Drop
 Peter Gabriel
Gil Scott Heron
Salif Keita
Paul Kelly and the Stormwater Boys
 Nusrat Fateh Ali Khan
Kimbra
Late Nite Tuff Guy
Leningrad Cowboys
Lior
Mad Professor
 Baaba Maal
Miriam Makeba
Master Drummers of Burundi
Melbourne Ska Orchestra
 Midnight Oil
 Not Drowning, Waving
 Ozomatli
Archie Roach
 Xavier Rudd
Shooglenifty
The Specials
 Dan Sultan
Thandi Phoenix
Themba
 Violent Femmes
Marina Satti & Fones
Tiddas
The Waifs
Les Yeux Noirs
Yungchen Lhamo
Zap Mama
Noriko Tadano
Courtney Barnett

References

External links

WOMAD
Music festivals in Australia
WOMAD
1992 establishments in Australia
Recurring events established in 1992
World music festivals